Selbhorn is with an elevation of  the highest mountain in the Steinernes Meer, a sub-range of the Berchtesgaden Alps. It is located in the Austrian state Salzburg, close to the German border.

References 

Mountains of Salzburg (state)
Mountains of the Alps
Two-thousanders of Austria
Berchtesgaden Alps